Anania quebecensis, the Quebec phlyctaenia moth, is a moth in the family Crambidae. It was described by Eugene G. Munroe in 1954. It is found in North America, where it has been recorded from Ontario to Nova Scotia and Maine, south to Maryland and Virginia.

References

Moths described in 1954
Pyraustinae
Moths of North America